David Harper (29 September 1938 – 24 January 2013) was an English footballer who played as a midfielder in the Football League. He was born in Peckham, London.

His son, Frank Harper, is a British actor whose roles include that of the father of a football-loving teenage girl (played by Keira Knightley) in Bend It Like Beckham (2002).

References

1938 births
2013 deaths
English footballers
Footballers from Peckham
Association football midfielders
Swindon Town F.C. players
Leyton Orient F.C. players
Ipswich Town F.C. players
Millwall F.C. players
English Football League players